The Taiwan Cinefest is Europe's largest Taiwanese film festival based in London with editions throughout the UK. It is a dedicated platform for Taiwanese filmmakers to reach and connect with an international audience. The festival was founded by Steven Flynn and is run through Cinefest Productions. The Taiwan Cinefest New York edition is being introduced in late 2010.

Festival Edition Summary

March 17–21 (London) & March 23–31 (Glasgow)
Sorry, I Love You (U premiere)
A Place of One's Own (UK premiere)
Island Etude
How Are You Dad? (UK premiere)
Yang Yang

April 15–19, 2009
Films screened:
Cape No. 7
Winds of September
What on Earth Have i Done!? (UK premiere)
Parking (Opening Night)
My So-Called Love (UK premiere)
The Most Distant Course (Closing Night) (UK premiere)

References

External links
 
 
 
 

Film festivals in London